The  is a Grade 1 horse race in for Thoroughbred colts and fillies aged four and over run over a distance of 2,000 metres at Hanshin Racecourse. The race is run in early April.

It was first run in 1957 over 1800 metres. The distance was increased to 1900 metres in 1966 before the race was run over its current distance for the first time in 1972.

Among the winners of the race have been Katsuragi Ace, Tokai Teio, Mejiro McQueen, Air Groove, Neo Universe, Meisho Samson, Daiwa Scarlet, Orfevre and Kizuna.

The Ōsaka Hai was promoted from Grade 2 status (as it has been since 1984) to Grade 1 in 2017. Prior to 2017, the race was known as the Sankei Ōsaka Hai and served as a trial race for the spring edition of the Tenno Sho. From 2017 the winner will have a guaranteed and complimentary entry to that season's Irish Champion Stakes.

Records
Speed record:
1:57.8 Hiruno d'Amour 2011

Most successful horse (2 wins):
 Sunrise Pegasus – 2002, 2005

Winners since 1992

Earlier winners

 1957 – Homare Ichi
 1958 – Katsura Homare
 1959 – Kiyo Sugata
 1960 – Wildeal
 1961 – Kodame
 1962 – Sugihime
 1963 – Ryu Z
 1964 – Tetsuno O
 1965 – Young Hero
 1966 – Ballymoss Nisei
 1967 – Ryu Pharos
 1968 – Yama Pit
 1969 – Date Horai
 1970 – Shunsaku O
 1971 – Tokino Shin O
 1972 – Kei Takashi
 1973 – Takuma O
 1974 – Nihon Pillow Moutiers
 1975 – Sky Leader
 1976 – Long Hawk
 1977 – Gold Eagle
 1978 – King Lanark
 1979 – Metro Jumbo
 1980 – Hashi Kranz
 1981 – Sancy Doll
 1982 – Sanei Tholon
 1983 – Hikari Duel
 1984 – Katsuragi Ace
 1985 – State Jaguar
 1986 – Sakura Yutaka O
 1987 – Nishino Raiden
 1988 – Fresh Voice
 1989 – Yaeno Muteki
 1990 – Super Creek
 1991 – White Stone

See also
 Horse racing in Japan
 List of Japanese flat horse races

References
Racing Post: 

Turf races in Japan